Centre scolaire Léo-Rémillard (abbreviated CSLR) is a French-language high school situated in the southeastern part of Winnipeg, Manitoba, in Canada.  It currently offers grade 9 to grade 12.  This school was built in honor of the writer Léo Rémillard, and it is part of the Division Scolaire Franco-Manitobaine.
St. Vital, Winnipeg

French-language schools in Manitoba
High schools in Manitoba
2007 establishments in Manitoba
Educational institutions established in 2007